Alsobia is a genus of flowering plants in the family Gesneriaceae, native to Mexico, Guatemala, and Costa Rica. It contains four species.

The species in the genus are succulent and stoloniferous herbs. They were previously included in the genus Episcia, but recent molecular studies have supported the separation of Alsobia from Episcia.

Species
Alsobia baroniae
Alsobia chiapensis
Alsobia dianthiflora (syn. Episcia dianthiflora)
Alsobia punctata (syn. Episcia punctata)

Further reading
Wiehler, H. 1978. The genera Episcia, Alsobia, Nautilocalyx, and Paradrymonia (Gesneriaceae). Selbyana 5: 11–60.

References

External links
Alsobia from the Gesneriad Reference Web
Episcia and Alsobia from the Gesneriad Reference Web

Gesnerioideae
Gesneriaceae genera